Sofia Akhmeteli (born 28 March 1981) is a former Georgian alpine skier. She competed at the 1998 Winter Olympics and in the 2002 Winter Olympics representing Georgia.

Sofia was also the flagbearer for Georgia in 1998 Winter Olympics and in the 2002 Winter Olympics.

References 

1981 births
Living people
Female alpine skiers from Georgia  (country)
Olympic alpine skiers of Georgia (country)
Alpine skiers at the 1998 Winter Olympics
Alpine skiers at the 2002 Winter Olympics